A bar or borrow ditch is a roadside channel dug for drainage purposes. Typically, the dirt is "borrowed" from the ditch, and used to crown the road. It is a variation of a bar or borrow pit, in construction, when dirt is removed and used for construction purposes, and later left to fill with water, forming ponds or lakes. Also, adjacent to pasturage, the ditch confines livestock, keeping them from straying onto road.  The term is most often used in the Southwestern United States.

Notes

Drainage